Dennis J. Kearney (born September 25, 1949 in Chelsea, Massachusetts) is an American attorney and politician who served as a Massachusetts state representative and Sheriff of Suffolk County. He finished sixth in the 1983 Boston mayoral election with 7% of the vote. He is currently the President of the law firm Kearney, Donovan & McGee, P.C.

References

1949 births
Democratic Party members of the Massachusetts House of Representatives
Politicians from Boston
Harvard Kennedy School alumni
Sheriffs of Suffolk County, Massachusetts
Living people
Lawyers from Boston